Skagen railway station is the main railway station serving the town of Skagen in Vendsyssel, Denmark.

The station is the northern terminus of the Skagensbanen railway line from Frederikshavn to Skagen and is the most northerly railway station in Denmark. The station opened in 1890 with the opening of the Skagensbanen railway line. The current station building was built in 1919. The train services are currently operated by the railway company Nordjyske Jernbaner (NJ) which run frequent local train services between Skagen and Frederikshavn with onward connections from Frederikshavn to the rest of Denmark.

History 

The station opened in 1890 to serve as terminus of the new narrow gauge railway line from Frederikshavn to Skagen. In 1924, the railway line was converted to standard gauge to avoid the need to transfer cargoes of fish in Frederikshavn. As a consequence of the conversion, the right-of-way through Skagen town as well as the layout of Skagen station was extensively changed.

For a period, the Skagen tourist information centre was located in the station building, but in 2006 it moved to its current location by the Skagen Harbour.

Architecture 

The original station building from 1890 was designed by architect Thomas Arboe. The current station building was built in 1919 and is the work of architect Ulrik Plesner. It is in the style of the town's typical yellow-plastered houses with red tiled roofs with white trimmings which were built in Skagen from 1890 to 1930 and designed by Plesner. He was also the architect behind many other buildings in the town, including Brøndums Hotel and Skagen Museum.

In 1914, King Christian X of Denmark built the villa Klitgården by the Kattegat coast southwest of Skagen as a summer residence for the Danish royal family. Therefore, one of Skagen Station's two waiting rooms in the northern wing was furnished as a royal waiting room. Later, the Skagen Tourist Office has been housed in the royal waiting room, but in the autumn of 2006 the agency moved to the newly renovated harbor master's residence by the Skagen Harbor. In 2007, the former director's apartment on the station's 1st floor was converted into 3 apartments.

In 2017, the station building was thoroughly renovated, as it had fallen into disrepair. The renovation included new windows, the facade, the opening of a café in the former royal waiting room, and an extension.

Operations

Train services 
The train services are currently operated by Nordjyske Jernbaner (NJ) which run frequent local train services from Skagen station to Frederikshavn station with onward connections to the rest of Denmark.

In a period during the 1990s there were direct InterCity connections between Copenhagen and Skagen, operated by DSB.

Bus services 
In 2005, NJ replaced the bus connections between Skagen and Frederikshavn with more frequent train connections. Since then, there have only been bus connections from the station during the summer season, when Nordjyllands Trafikselskab's summer bus service connects Skagen with Blokhus.

References

Bibliography

External links

 Nordjyske Jernbaner – Danish railway company operating in North Jutland Region
 Danske Jernbaner – website with information on railway history in Denmark
 Nordjyllands Jernbaner – website with information on railway history in North Jutland
 Skagensiden.dk – website with information on Skagen

Railway stations in the North Jutland Region
Railway stations opened in 1890
Buildings and structures in Skagen
Ulrik Plesner railway stations
Railway stations in Denmark opened in the 19th century